NTHS may refer to:
 National Technical Honor Society, an American honor society
National Trunk Highway System, a system of expressways in China

Schools 
 Kaohsiung Municipal Nanzih Comprehensive Senior High School, Kaohsiung, Taiwan
 National Trail High School, New Paris, Ohio, United States
 New Town High School (Maryland), Owings Mills, Maryland, United States
 New Town High School (Tasmania), New Town, Tasmania, Australia
 New Trier High School,  Winnetka, Illinois, United States
 North Tonawanda High School, North Tonawanda, New York, United States
 North Tahoe High School, Tahoe City, California, United States
 North Thurston High School, Lacey, Washington, United States